Aldo Pifferi (born 26 October 1938) is an Italian racing cyclist. He won stage 16 of the 1965 Giro d'Italia.

References

External links
 

1938 births
Living people
Italian male cyclists
Italian Giro d'Italia stage winners
Place of birth missing (living people)
Cyclists from the Province of Como